Steve Shenbaum is a former actor and founder and president of Game on Nation, a communication, leadership, and business consultancy best known for its work with corporations, collegiate, and professional athletes and athletic teams.

Early life and education
Shenbaum grew up in West Covina, California but moved to Chicago, Illinois to attend college at Northwestern University. He graduated from Northwestern with a degree in Theatre and Performance. He later trained at the British American Drama Academy.

Career

Game On Nation
Shenbaum founded Game On Nation in 1997. In 2003, Game On Nation partnered with IMG Academy and relocated to IMG’s Bradenton, Florida campus. The company’s partnership with IMG ended in 2012 when game on expanded its presence nationwide, adding clients including the United States military and corporations throughout the country.

Acting career

References

External links
 

American businesspeople
American male television actors
Living people
Northwestern University School of Communication alumni
Year of birth missing (living people)